Altissimo is an album by alto saxophonists Gary Bartz, Lee Konitz, Jackie McLean and Charlie Mariano which was recorded in Denmark in 1973 and first released on the Japanese Philips label.

Reception 

The Allmusic review by Ron Wynn states: "This is a great summit meeting".

Track listing 
All compositions by Lee Konitz except where noted
 "Another Hairdo" (Charlie Parker) – 3:45
 "Mode for Jay Mac"(Billy Gault) – 9:45
 "Love Choral" – 7:32
 "Fanfare" – 6:09
 "Du (Rain)" (Gary Bartz) – 3:32
 "Hymn" – 3:07
 "Telieledu Rama" (Tyagaraja) – 7:33

Personnel 
 Gary Bartz, Lee Konitz, Jackie McLean, Charlie Mariano – alto saxophone
Joachim Kühn – piano
Palle Danielsson – bass
Han Bennink – drums

References 

 

Gary Bartz albums
Lee Konitz albums
Charlie Mariano albums
Jackie McLean albums
1973 albums
Philips Records albums
West Wind Records albums